Patrick Botterman (1964-2008) was an elected Harper College trustee and Wheeling Township Committeeman of the Cook County Democratic Party. He also managed campaigns for Democratic candidates. He lived in Arlington Heights.

References

External links
Chicago Tribune: Patrick Botterman, veteran Democratic political operative and Wheeling Township Democratic committeeman, dies at age 44
Daily Kos: Patrick Botterman - yesterday we lost a good one
Daily Kos: Beloved Democratic Mainstay Patrick Botterman Passes Away

People from Arlington Heights, Illinois
Illinois Democrats
1964 births
2008 deaths